Grlom u jagode (Cyrillic: Грлом у јагоде, "The Unpicked Strawberries") is a 1975 Yugoslavian TV series directed by Srđan Karanović and co-written by Karanović and Rajko Grlić. Depicting the life and times of a young man nicknamed Bane Bumbar, the series achieved huge popularity throughout SFR Yugoslavia.

Revolving around Bane, his family, and his circle of friends, the series also portrays 1960s Belgrade, Serbia and Yugoslavia.

Overview
Bane Bumbar is growing up in Stara Karaburma neighbourhood with his parents Sreta and Olja, his half-sister Seka Štajn (his mother's child form a previous marriage) and his maternal grandmother Elvira.

His circle of friends includes characters such as Miki Rubiroza, Glupi Uške, Boca Čombe, as well as his off-and-on girlfriend Goca.

Occasionally narrated by Bane and other characters from a distance of 10–15 years, each one of Grlom u jagodes 10 episodes depicts a different year from 1960 to 1969, inclusive, with Bane's various endeavours, concerns, education, love life, etc. taking center stage during each particular episode.

Main charactersBane Bumbar is a city kid growing up in post-war Belgrade, the capital of communist Yugoslavia. Born Branislav Živković' to parents Sreta and Olja, both of whom fought in the World War II on the Partisan side, his birth date is in 1945, couple of days before the war officially ended.

Episodes

References

External links 
 

Radio Television of Serbia original programming
1976 Yugoslav television series debuts
1976 Yugoslav television series endings
Television series set in the 1960s
Serbian drama television series
Serbian-language television shows
1970s Yugoslav television series
Television shows set in Belgrade
Television shows filmed in Belgrade
Coming-of-age television shows